Maharlu Kohneh (also Romanized as Mahārlū Kohneh) is a village in Maharlu Rural District, Kuhenjan District, Sarvestan County, Fars Province, Iran. At the 2006 census, its population was 620, in 144 families.

References 

Populated places in Sarvestan County